George Gamble (born 17 July 1996 in Nottingham, England) is a British racing driver currently competing in the British Touring Car Championship for Car Gods with Cicely Motorsport.

Career

Karting
Gamble competed in various karting championships from 2007 to 2010, competing against the likes of Formula 1 driver Alex Albon, Formula E driver Jake Dennis, and World Endurance Championship driver and former IndyCar driver Ed Jones.

Ginetta Junior Championship
Gamble made his car racing debut in the 2010 Ginetta Junior Winter Series with HHC Motorsport, and signed with TJ Motorsport for his debut full season in the main championship the following year. In the main championship he would finish 3rd overall with 3 wins. He also competed in the Winter Series in 2011, which he won. 

He signed with Hillspeed to compete in the 2012 championship, but he withdrew from the series after two rounds.

Formula Renault BARC Winter Series
Months after his Ginetta Junior withdrawal, Gamble competed in the Formula Renault BARC Winter Series with Hillspeed, where he finished 7th overall.

Ginetta GT5 Challenge
In 2013, Gamble would move to the Ginetta GT5 Challenge, where he raced in one round with Total Control Racing, of which he won both races in this round, putting him 18th in the standings.

Gamble continued with TCR for his first full season in 2014, which he won, with 7 victories and 18 podiums.

Ginetta GT4 Supercup
After a two year sabbatical to aid his younger brother Tom in karting, Gamble made his racing return in the 2017 Ginetta GT4 Supercup, racing with JHR Developments. He finished 3rd overall, with 4 wins.

British GT
Gamble appeared at the Rockingham round of the 2017 British GT Championship alongside Anna Walewska at Century Motorsport.

Porsche Carrera Cup Great Britain
Gamble joined Amigos Team Parker for the 2018 Porsche Carrera Cup Great Britain, where he finished 6th overall in the Pro class with 3 wins.

He switched to Amigos Redline Racing for the 2019 season, where he finished 3rd in the Pro class with 4 wins.

Porsche Supercup
Gamble appeared at the Silverstone round of the 2019 Porsche Supercup, racing as a guest driver for JTR.

GT4 European Series
Gamble raced in the Circuit Paul Ricard round of the 2020 GT4 European Series with R-Motorsport alongside Seb Perez.

British Touring Car Championship
On 28 February 2022, it was announced that Gamble would make his BTCC debut in the 2022 British Touring Car Championship, racing alongside Adam Morgan at Car Gods with Ciceley Motorsport.

He achieved his first win in the series in Race 3 at the Knockhill Racing Circuit in the 2022 season.

Personal life
Gamble's younger brother, Tom, is also a racing driver who currently competes in endurance racing. George took a two year sabbatical in 2015 and 2016 in order to aid Tom in karting.

Controversy
In 2018, Gamble gained publicity after crashing a Ford Ranger into a house while intoxicated. He received a 20 month ban from driving on the road.

Karting record

Karting career summary

Racing record

Racing career summary

Complete British Touring Car Championship results
(key) (Races in bold indicate pole position – 1 point awarded just in first race; races in italics indicate fastest lap – 1 point awarded all races; * signifies that driver led race for at least one lap – 1 point given all races)

References

External links 
 

1996 births
Living people
English racing drivers
British racing drivers
Ginetta Junior Championship drivers
Ginetta GT4 Supercup drivers
Porsche Carrera Cup GB drivers
British Touring Car Championship drivers
Formula Renault BARC drivers
Porsche Supercup drivers
JHR Developments drivers
R-Motorsport drivers
GT4 European Series drivers